The following television stations in the United States brand as channel 11 (though neither using virtual channel 11 nor broadcasting on physical RF channel 11):
 KDFX-CD in Indio/Palm Springs, California
 KKFX-CD in San Luis Obispo, California
 KTVL-DT2 in Medford, Oregon
 KUAM-DT2 in Hagåtña, Guam
 KYMA-DT in Yuma, Arizona
 WBNG-DT2 in Binghamton, New York
 WCHS-DT2 in Charleston, West Virginia
 WKTV-DT2 in Utica, New York

The following television stations in the United States, which are no longer licensed, formerly branded as channel 11:
 KAAP-LP in Santa Cruz, California
 KUAM-LP in Tamuning/Hagåtña, Guam

11 branded